The 2012–13 National League 2 North was the third season (twenty-sixth overall) of the fourth tier (north) of the English domestic rugby union competitions since the professionalised format of the second division was introduced.  The league system was 4 points for a win, 2 points for a draw and additional bonus points being awarded for scoring 4 or more tries and/or losing within 7 points of the victorious team. In terms of promotion the league champions would go straight up into National League 1 while the runners up would have a one-game playoff against the runners up from National League 2 South (at the home ground of the club with the superior league record) for the final promotion place.

The league title battle was extremely tight this year with Hull Ionians eventually taking the championship and promotion to the 2013–14 National League 1 ahead of Stourbridge with both sides dead level on points but Ionians having more wins despite Stourbridge having a much better for/against record and more bonus points.   As runners up Stourbridge faced the 2012–13 National League 2 South runners up Worthing Raiders in what would be a very close game - losing 26 - 28 to the south coast side - meaning that the Stourton Park-based side would not have an instant return to National League 1.  At the other end of the table Huddersfield were easily the weakest team in the division and were the first to be relegated, with the more competitive Stockport and Westoe being the other two sides to follow them by the end of the season.  All three sides would drop down to National League 3 North for the following season.

Participating teams and locations

Twelve of the teams listed below participated in the 2011–12 National League 2 North season; Stourbridge and Birmingham & Solihull were relegated from the 2011–12 National League 1 while Dudley Kingswinford came up from National League 3 Midlands as playoff winners along with Darlington Mowden Park who were champions of National League 3 North. Rugby Lions had won the National League 3 Midlands title and were expected to join the 2012–13 National League 2 South instead of National League 2 North but went into liquidation over the summer and dropped out of the leagues leaving the southern division with just 15 teams.  The season also saw newly demoted Birmingham & Solihull move from ground-sharing with a local football team at Damson Park to their former training base Portway.  Another team would switch grounds during the season, with Darlington Mowden Park playing their first game at the 25,000 capacity The Northern Echo Arena (former home of the ill-fated football team Darlington F.C.) on 2 February 2013 against Bromsgrove.

Final league table

Results

Round 1

Round 2

Round 3

Round 4

Round 5

Round 6

Round 7

Round 8

Round 9

Round 10

Round 11

Round 12

Round 13 

Postponed.  Game rescheduled to 1 December 2012.

Round 13 (rescheduled game) 

Game rescheduled from 24 November 2012.

Round 14

Round 15 

Postponed.  Game rescheduled to 9 February 2013.

Round 16 

Postponed.  Game rescheduled to 9 February 2013.

Postponed.  Game rescheduled to 9 February 2013.

Postponed.  Game rescheduled to 9 February 2013.

Postponed.  Game rescheduled to 9 February 2013.

Round 17

Round 18

Round 19 

Postponed.  Game rescheduled to 23 February 2013.

Postponed.  Game rescheduled to 23 February 2013.

Postponed.  Game rescheduled to 23 February 2013.

Postponed.  Game rescheduled to 23 February 2013.

Postponed.  Game rescheduled to 23 February 2013.

Postponed.  Game rescheduled to 4 May 2013.

Postponed.  Game rescheduled to 4 May 2013.

Round 20 

Postponed.  Game rescheduled to 16 March 2013.

Postponed.  Game rescheduled to 16 March 2013.

Postponed.  Game rescheduled to 16 March 2013.

Postponed.  Game rescheduled to 16 March 2013.

Postponed.  Game rescheduled to 16 March 2013.

Postponed.  Game rescheduled to 16 March 2013.

Round 21

Rounds 15 & 16 (rescheduled games) 

Game rescheduled from 22 December 2012.

Game rescheduled from 22 December 2012.

Game rescheduled from 22 December 2012.

Game rescheduled from 15 December 2012.

Game rescheduled from 22 December 2012.

Round 22

Round 19 (rescheduled games) 

Game rescheduled from 19 January 2013.

Game rescheduled from 19 January 2013.

Game rescheduled from 19 January 2013.

Game rescheduled from 19 January 2013.

Game rescheduled from 19 January 2013.

Round 23

Round 24

Round 20 (rescheduled games) 

Game rescheduled from 26 January 2013.

Game rescheduled from 26 January 2013.

Game rescheduled from 26 January 2013.

Game rescheduled from 26 January 2013.

Game rescheduled from 26 January 2013.

Game rescheduled from 26 January 2013.

Round 25 

Postponed.  Game rescheduled to 4 May 2013.

Game was initially postponed but would ultimately be cancelled due to fixture congestion at the end of the season and the result would not affect the final outcome of the league.

Postponed.  Game rescheduled to 4 May 2013.

Game was initially postponed but would ultimately be cancelled due to fixture congestion at the end of the season and the result would not affect the final outcome of the league.

Postponed.  Game rescheduled to 11 May 2013.

Postponed.  Game rescheduled to 8 May 2013.

Round 26 

Postponed.  Game rescheduled to 4 May 2013.

Round 27

Round 28

Round 29

Round 30

Rounds 19, 25 & 26 (rescheduled games) 

Game rescheduled from 23 March 2013.

Game rescheduled from 30 March 2013.

Game rescheduled from 23 March 2013.

Game rescheduled from 19 January 2013.

Game rescheduled from 19 January 2013.

Round 25 (rescheduled game) 

Game rescheduled from 23 March 2013.

Round 25 (rescheduled game) 

Game rescheduled from 23 March 2013.

Promotion play-off
Each season, the runners–up in the National League 2 South and National League 2 North participate in a play–off for promotion into National League 1. Stourbridge as runners-up in the north had the better league record than southern counterparts Worthing Raiders and would host the game.

Total season attendances 
Figures not including north-south promotion playoff.

Individual statistics 

 Note that points scorers includes tries as well as conversions, penalties and drop goals.

Top points scorers

Top try scorers

Season records

Team
Largest home win — 64 pts (x2)
69 - 5 Darlington Mowden Park at home to Huddersfield on 23 February 2013
83 - 19 Preston Grasshoppers at home to Leicester Lions on 20 April 2013
Largest away win — 59 pts
64 - 5 Luctonians away to Huddersfield on 20 April 2013
Most points scored — 83 pts 
83 - 19 Preston Grasshoppers at home to Leicester Lions on 20 April 2013
Most tries in a match — 13 
Preston Grasshoppers at home to Leicester Lions on 20 April 2013
Most conversions in a match — 9
Preston Grasshoppers at home to Leicester Lions on 20 April 2013
Most penalties in a match — 6 (x3)
Darlington Mowden Park away to Birmingham & Solihull on 15 September 2012
Hull at home to Otley on 13 October 2012
Birmingham & Solihull at home to Bromsgrove on 17 November 2012
Most drop goals in a match — 1
N/A - multiple times

Player
Most points in a match — 33
 Sean Taylor for Preston Grasshoppers at home to Leicester Lions on 20 April 2013
Most tries in a match — 4 (x3)
 Shaun McCartney for Darlington Mowden Park at home to Bromsgrove on 2 February 2013
 James Twomey for Otley at home to Dudley Kingswinford on 27 April 2013
 Adam Birchall for Preston Grasshoppers at home to Luctonians on 11 May 2013
Most conversions in a match — 9
 Sean Taylor for Preston Grasshoppers at home to Leicester Lions on 20 April 2013
Most penalties in a match — 6 (x2)
 Gregory Lound for Hull at home to Otley on 13 October 2012
 Jack Jolly for Birmingham & Solihull at home to Bromsgrove on 17 November 2012
Most drop goals in a match — 1
N/A - multiple players

Attendances
Highest — 1,250 
Darlington Mowden Park at home to Bromsgrove on 2 February 2013
Lowest — 90 
Westoe at home to Darlington Mowden Park on 22 December 2012
Highest Average Attendance — 577
Stourbridge
Lowest Average Attendance — 130
Leicester Lions

See also
 English Rugby Union Leagues
 English rugby union system
 Rugby union in England

References

External links
 NCA Rugby

2012-13
2012–13 in English rugby union leagues